Al-Faw Sport Club is an Iraqi football team based in Al-Faw, Basra, that plays in Iraq Division Three.

Managerial history
  Ali Musa  
  Ali Abdullah

See also 
 2021–22 Iraq Division Three

References

External links
 Iraq Clubs- Foundation Dates
 Basra Clubs Union

Football clubs in Iraq
1993 establishments in Iraq
Association football clubs established in 1993
Football clubs in Basra
Basra